Aktenge Keunimjaeva is an Uzbekistani freestyle wrestler. She is a two-time bronze medalist at the Asian Wrestling Championships, both in 2019 and in 2020. She is also a silver medalist at the 2021 Islamic Solidarity Games held in Konya, Turkey.

Career 

In 2019, she competed in the women's freestyle 53kg event at the World Wrestling Championships held in Nur-Sultan, Kazakhstan. She was eliminated in her first match by Lianna Montero of Cuba.

She competed at the 2021 Asian Wrestling Olympic Qualification Tournament held in Almaty, Kazakhstan.

In 2022, she competed at the Yasar Dogu Tournament held in Istanbul, Turkey. She won the silver medal in the 53 kg event at the 2021 Islamic Solidarity Games held in Konya, Turkey. She competed in the 53kg event at the 2022 World Wrestling Championships held in Belgrade, Serbia.

Achievements

References

External links 
 

Living people
Year of birth missing (living people)
Place of birth missing (living people)
Uzbekistani female sport wrestlers
Asian Wrestling Championships medalists
Islamic Solidarity Games competitors for Uzbekistan
Islamic Solidarity Games medalists in wrestling
21st-century Uzbekistani women